American Horror Story is an American anthology horror television series created and produced by Ryan Murphy and Brad Falchuk, which premiered on October 5, 2011, on FX. Each season is conceived as a self-contained miniseries, following a different set of characters and settings, and a storyline with its own "beginning, middle, and end". Every season has been nominated for multiple Primetime Emmy Awards. The first six seasons have won, with Roanoke winning one, Murder House, Asylum and Hotel each winning two, Coven winning four, and Freak Show winning ten.

 In January 2020, the series was renewed for three more seasons, up to its thirteenth.

Series overview

Episodes

Season 1: Murder House (2011)

Season 2: Asylum (2012–13)

Season 3: Coven (2013–14)

Season 4: Freak Show (2014–15)

Season 5: Hotel (2015–16)

Season 6: Roanoke (2016)

Season 7: Cult (2017)

Season 8: Apocalypse (2018)

Season 9: 1984 (2019)

Season 10: Double Feature (2021)

Season 11: NYC (2022)

Notes

References

External links

 
 

 
Episodes
American Horror Story